Greg Ritter (born 20 February 1973, in Victoria) is an Australian racing driver. He was the winner of the 1999 Australian Formula Ford Championship. and shared the winning drive at the 2004 Betta Electrical 500.

Career results

Complete Bathurst 1000 results

References

External links
 V8 Supercar statistics

1973 births
Living people
Supercars Championship drivers
Formula Ford drivers
Racing drivers from Victoria (Australia)
Dick Johnson Racing drivers
Garry Rogers Motorsport drivers
Stone Brothers Racing drivers